Srampickal Ittan Mappilai (died 30 November 1702) was a trader, agriculturalist, and landlord in Palai, India. He was born in the Srampickal family of Pala, a branch of the ancient Palackal family of Pallipuram.

Life 
Mappilai lived in Palai in the 17th century. He formed trade relationships with Tamil Nadu. A mukalappada (Muslim army) from Tamil Nadu set fire to St. Thomas Cathedral, Pala during the last decade of the 17th century. The land under the church was owned by Mappilai. He rebuilt the church with his own money, but ran out, leaving him in debt. Later his brothers of Thayyil family completed the inside of the Church.

He died lying on the veranda of the church on 30 November 1702, and was buried in the church cemetery.

In 1953 one of his descendants, Srampickal Mukkalil Thoman, handed over the legal title of the church land to Palai Diocese.

References 

1702 deaths
People from Pala, Kerala